The 2022 Atlantic hurricane season was the first season since 1997 in which no tropical cyclones formed in August, and the first season on record to do so during a La Niña year. It was a fairly average hurricane season with an average number of named storms, a slightly above-average number of hurricanes, a slightly below-average number of major hurricanes (category 3 or higher on the 5-level Saffir–Simpson wind speed scale), and a near-normal accumulated cyclone energy (ACE) index. Despite this, it became one of the costliest Atlantic hurricane seasons on record, mostly due to Hurricane Ian. There were fourteen named storms during the season. Eight of them strengthened into a hurricane, and two reached major hurricane intensity. The season officially began on June 1, and ended on November 30. These dates, adopted by convention, historically describe the period in each year when most subtropical or tropical cyclogenesis occurs in the Atlantic Ocean. This year's first named storm, Tropical Storm Alex, developed five days after the start of the season, making this the first season since 2014 not to have a pre-season named storm.

Two systems developed on July 1. Tropical Storm Bonnie formed and made landfall near the Costa Rica–Nicaragua border. It then crossed over into the Pacific basin, becoming the first to survive the crossover from the Atlantic to the Pacific since Hurricane Otto in 2016. Also, Tropical Storm Colin formed abruptly and made landfall in South Carolina. It quickly weakened and dissipated the next day. Following this activity, tropical cyclogenesis was suppressed across the basin for several weeks by a combination of high wind shear, drier air, and the presence of the Saharan Air Layer. After a 60-day lull in tropical cyclone activity, Hurricanes Danielle and Earl formed on September 1 and 3 respectively, with Danielle becoming the season's first hurricane. The last season to have its first hurricane develop this late was 2013.

Activity then increased tremendously towards the end of the month as four named storms formed in quick succession. Among them, Hurricane Fiona became the season's first major hurricane on September 20, which is about three weeks later than when the first one typically forms. As an extratropical cyclone it became the strongest storm in Canadian history, as measured by central pressure, and caused significant damage in Atlantic Canada. Hurricane Ian then became the second major hurricane of the season on September 27, before inflicting major to catastrophic damage upon Western Cuba, Southwestern and Central Florida, and the Carolinas. Hurricane Julia formed in early October and became the second storm of the season to cross over into the Pacific basin intact after traversing Nicaragua, making this season the first to have more than one crossover system since 1996. The last storm in the season, Hurricane Nicole, made landfall on the coasts of The Bahamas and Florida. It was the first November hurricane to make landfall in Florida since Kate in 1985, and caused heavy damage in areas devastated by Ian six weeks earlier.

Seasonal forecasts 

In advance of, and during, each hurricane season, several forecasts of hurricane activity are issued by national meteorological services, scientific agencies, and noted hurricane experts. These include forecasters from the United States National Oceanic and Atmospheric Administration (NOAA)'s Climate Prediction Center, Tropical Storm Risk (TSR), the United Kingdom's Met Office (UKMO), and Philip J. Klotzbach, William M. Gray and their associates at Colorado State University (CSU). The forecasts include weekly and monthly changes in significant factors that help determine the number of tropical storms, hurricanes, and major hurricanes within a particular year. According to NOAA and CSU, the average Atlantic hurricane season between 1991 and 2020 contained roughly 14 tropical storms, seven hurricanes, three major hurricanes, and an accumulated cyclone energy (ACE) index of 74–126 units. Broadly speaking, ACE is a measure of the power of a tropical or subtropical storm multiplied by the length of time it existed. NOAA typically categorizes a season as above-average, average, or below-average based on the cumulative ACE index, but the number of tropical storms, hurricanes, and major hurricanes within a hurricane season is sometimes also considered.

Pre-season forecasts 
On December 9, 2021, CSU issued an extended range forecast for the 2022 hurricane season, giving a 40% chance of near-average activity with 13–16 named storms, 6–8 hurricanes, 2–3 major hurricanes, and an ACE index of about 130 units. The forecast also gave a 25% chance that the ACE Index would end up being around 170 units, and a 25% likelihood the likelihood that the index would end up around 80. TSR also issued an extended range forecast on December 10, 2021. It predicted overall near-average tropical activity with its ACE index, anticipating 18 tropical storms, 8 hurricanes and 3 intense hurricanes to form during the season. One of their factors was the expectation of a neutral El Niño-Southern Oscillation condition by the third quarter of 2022. This outlook had "large uncertainties".

On April 7, CSU issued their first extended range seasonal forecast for the 2022 Atlantic hurricane season, predicting well above-average activity, with 19 named storms, 9 hurricanes, 4 major hurricanes and an ACE index of 160 units. Their factors supporting an active hurricane season included above average-sea surface temperatures in the subtropical Atlantic Ocean and Caribbean Sea, and a cool neutral ENSO or weak La Niña pattern, corresponding to a low chance of an El Niño. On April 14, 2022, University of Arizona (UA) issued its seasonal prediction for a slightly above-average hurricane season, with 14 named storms, seven hurricanes, three major hurricanes, and an ACE index of 129 units. North Carolina State University (NCSU) made its prediction for the season on April 20, calling for an above-average season with 17 to 21 named storms, 7 to 9 hurricanes, and 3 to 5 major hurricanes.

On May 23, UKMO issued their own forecast for the 2022 season, predicting an above average season with 18 named storms, 9 hurricanes, and 4 major hurricanes, with a 70% chance that each of these statistics will fall between 13 and 23, 6 and 12, and 2 and 6, respectively. The following day, NOAA's Climate Prediction Center issued their forecasts for the season, predicting a 65% chance of above-average activity and 25% chance for below-average activity, with 14–21 named storms, 6–10 hurricanes, and 3–6 major hurricanes.

Mid-season forecasts 
On June 2, CSU updated their extended range seasonal forecast, increasing the amount of tropical cyclones to 20 named storms, 10 hurricanes, 5 major hurricanes, and an overall ACE index of 180 units. This was done after later analysis of lower chances of an El Niño during the season, as well as a warmer than average tropical Atlantic. On June 20, 2022, University of Arizona (UA) updated its seasonal prediction, which is very similar to its April prediction, with 15 named storms, seven hurricanes, three major hurricanes, and an ACE index of 131 units. On July 5, TSR released their third forecast for the season, slightly increasing their numbers to 18 named storms, 9 hurricanes, and 4 major hurricanes. This prediction was largely based on the persistence of the weak La Niña into the third quarter of the year. On July 7, CSU did not make changes to their updated prediction of 20 named storms, 10 hurricanes, and 5 major hurricanes. UKMO's updated forecast on August 2 called for 16 named storms, 6 hurricanes, and 4 major hurricanes. Two days later, NOAA and CSU each revised their activity outlook slightly downward, though both still predicted that the season would end up being busier than the 30-year average. The revisions were made in part because of the relative slow start to the season (as compared to the past couple), with only three short-lived named storms as of the start of August.

Seasonal summary 

The 2022 season was the first season since 2014 to not have a pre-season named storm. It was also the first season not to have above-average activity overall since 2015. Activity began with the formation of Tropical Storm Alex on June 5, after several days of slow development while traversing the Gulf of Mexico and then moving over Central Florida. The storm peaked at near-hurricane strength before becoming extratropical over the Central North Atlantic. On July 1, Tropical Storm Bonnie formed in the Southern Caribbean Sea and made landfall shortly thereafter near the Costa Rica–Nicaragua border. It then crossed over into the Pacific basin a day later, the first storm to do so since Hurricane Otto in 2016, where it would become a Category 3 hurricane. Also on July 1, a low-pressure system off the U.S. Atlantic coast near Savannah, Georgia abruptly organized into Tropical Storm Colin, a short-lived storm that dissipated the next day inland over northeastern South Carolina. Tropical activity then ceased, with no tropical cyclones forming for almost two months. 2022 became the first season since 1997 to not have a tropical cyclone form in August,. One disturbance over the Gulf of Mexico during the middle of the month was briefly designated as a potential tropical cyclone, but it did not organize into a tropical cyclone before moving inland over Northeastern Mexico.

Tropical activity ultimately resumed with the formation of Tropical Storm Danielle over the central Atlantic on September 1. The storm intensified into a hurricane the following day, the latest "first hurricane of the season" since 2013. It remained nearly stationary far to the west of the Azores for several days before moving northeastward and becoming extratropical on September 8 without affecting any land areas. Additionally, a slow-developing disturbance east of the Lesser Antilles became organized and developed into Tropical Storm Earl late on  It strengthened into a hurricane, tracked east of Bermuda, fluctuating between Category 1 and 2 intensity, and then became extratropical near Newfoundland on September 10. Four days later, Tropical Storm Fiona formed in the Central Atlantic. Fiona eventually became a hurricane, striking both Puerto Rico and the Dominican Republic before becoming the season's first major hurricane as it passed by the Turks and Caicos Islands on September 20. That same day, Tropical Storm Gaston formed over the Central Atlantic and moved through the Western Azores. Fiona strengthened into a Category 4 hurricane as it passed west of Bermuda and transitioned into a powerful extratropical cyclone on September 23, just before striking Nova Scotia. That same day, Tropical Depression Nine formed in the Caribbean Sea and Tropical Depression Ten formed in the eastern tropical Atlantic, marking the first time since 2020 that four tropical cyclones were active simultaneously in the Atlantic basin.

Tropical Depression Nine became Hurricane Ian, the most destructive storm of the season. It made landfall in western Cuba as a high-end Category 3 hurricane, southwestern Florida as a high-end Category 4 hurricane, and in South Carolina as a Category 1. Tropical Depression Ten attained tropical storm strength first, becoming Tropical Storm Hermine. It was one of the easternmost Atlantic tropical storms on record, and brought heavy rainfall to the Canary Islands. Next, Tropical Depression Eleven formed during the last week in September, and then Tropical Depression Twelve formed one week later. Ultimately, neither cyclone strengthened into a tropical storm. Soon thereafter, Hurricane Julia formed just off the coast of Venezuela. After traversing Nicaragua intact, Julia entered the Pacific basin. Not since 1996 has more than one storm crossed between the Atlantic and Pacific basins intact during a single season. On October 11, Tropical Storm Karl formed in the Bay of Campeche, moved erratically over open waters, before degenerating into a remnant low offshore of Mexico. Two systems were at hurricane strength on November 2: Lisa, in the Caribbean, and Martin, in the central Atlantic. Thus, for the first time since Michelle and Noel in 2001, two Atlantic hurricanes were at hurricane strength simultaneously during November. Soon thereafter, Hurricane Nicole formed and impacted the Greater Antilles, The Bahamas, and the Southeastern United States.

This season's ACE index, as calculated by Colorado State University using data from the NHC, was approximately 95.1 units, which was 80% of the long-term (30-year) average. The ACE number represents the sum of the squares of the maximum sustained wind speed (knots) for all named storms while they are at least tropical storm intensity, divided by 10,000. Therefore, tropical depressions are not included.

Systems

Tropical Storm Alex 

In late May, the mid-level remnants of Hurricane Agatha in the Pacific basin interacted with a Central American Gyre. Consequently, a gradual increase in deep convection occurred over the Yucatán Peninsula and the northwestern Caribbean Sea, which led to the development of a low-pressure area just north of the Belize-Mexico border on June 2. After emerging into the southeastern Gulf of Mexico early the next day, the disturbance made multiple attempts at organizing into a tropical cyclone and attained tropical storm-force winds. However, strong wind shear kept the system disorganized before it struck Southwest Florida on June 4. Additional intensification occurred as Alex moved east-northeastward due to mid-latitude westerly flow, reaching sustained winds of  around 18:00 UTC. The remnants of Alex were absorbed by a baroclinic zone early on June 7.

Due to the threat the developing system posed to Cuba, the Florida Keys, and South Florida, the National Hurricane Center initiated advisories on it, designating it as Potential Tropical Cyclone One. The precursor to Alex dropped heavy precipitation in these regions. There were four storm-related deaths in Cuba, while about 750 homes,  of crops, and numerous bridges suffered flood damage. Extensive street flooding occurred in the Miami area, but water entered few properties. Across Broward and Miami-Dade counties combined, there were about 3,500 power outages. Damage from the precursor to Alex in Florida totaled $104,000.

Tropical Storm Bonnie 

A tropical wave moved off the northwest coast of Africa south of 10°N on June 23, producing a large but disorganized area of showers and thunderstorms. The low-level wind circulation associated with the system became better defined and thunderstorm activity increased on June 25–26, as it moved along a west to west-northwesterly track toward the southernmost Windward Islands. A NOAA Hurricane Hunters mission on June 27, reported tropical-storm-strength winds on the north side of the disturbance but indicated that it had not yet shown a well-defined closed circulation. Although it could not yet be classified as a tropical cyclone, due to the threat the system posed to the Lesser Antilles, the National Hurricane Center (NHC) initiated advisories on it as Potential Tropical Cyclone Two later that same day. Later, after moving through the southern Windward Islands late on June 28, the disturbance sped west at  toward the coast of South America. Over the next couple of days, the system passed just to the north of Venezuela, where it was hindered from developing a distinct low-level circulation due to its fast forward speed and its interaction with land. Yet all the while it generated sustained winds of tropical-storm strength. As the disturbance moved toward Central America on the morning of July 1, it became sufficiently organized to be classified as a tropical storm and was given the name Bonnie. Embedded in a low-shear and warm SST environment, Bonnie started to steadily intensify. Bonnie then crossed Central America and exited into the Eastern Pacific basin 12 hours later.

Bonnie and its precursor disturbance produced gusty winds and heavy rainfall as it tracked through the southern Caribbean Sea. In Nicaragua, authorities reported four deaths in relation to the storm.

Tropical Storm Colin 

An area of low pressure formed along a surface trough offshore of Savannah, Georgia, on the morning of July 1. During this time the system unexpectedly developed and quickly became well organized. Colin became increasingly disorganized later that day, with its circulation becoming elongated due to the wind shear and continued land interaction. It continued to weaken rapidly, and its low-level circulation dissipated over northeastern South Carolina by the end of that day.

A Fourth of July weekend event in Charleston was cancelled because of flooding at the event site, as was a festival in Southport, North Carolina. One person drowned on July 3, off the coast of Oak Island, North Carolina, due to rip currents.

Hurricane Danielle 

On August 31, an area of low pressure formed along a decaying frontal zone over the central subtropical Atlantic. Favorable conditions such as abnormally warm seas and light wind shear allowed Danielle to become a hurricane around 24 hours later. The hurricane stalled on September 2, caught south of a blocking high, and weakened back to a tropical storm the next day due to upwelling of cooler waters. Later, the storm drifted westward, where it again strengthened into a hurricane early on September 4. After turning northwestward, Danielle reached its peak intensity with sustained winds of 85 mph (140 km/h) late the following day. It then moved over a relatively cool part of the Gulf Stream and weakened to a low-end Category 1 hurricane. The hurricane briefly re-intensified when it moved over marginally warm waters on September 7, but resumed a weakening trend shortly thereafter. Danielle weakened to a tropical storm early on September 8, before transitioning into an extratropical cyclone later that day. The remnant extratropical system meandered over the northeastern Atlantic before dissipating offshore Portugal on September 15.

The remnants of Danielle dissipated offshore Portugal as an extratropical cyclone, bringing heavy rain to the country, including  of precipitation in Guarda in 24 hours. Between September 12–13, 644 accidents were reported throughout the country, along with many instances of downed trees and flash floods. In Manteigas, which had been ravaged by intense summer forest fires in nearby areas of the Serra da Estrela mountain range, floods and landslides caused major damage and at least four vehicles were dragged into the Zêzere River. Portuguese authorities also reported minor wind and flood damage in Lisbon and Setúbal. Much of Spain was put on yellow alert as wind, rain and thunderstorms triggered by the cyclone moved inland.

Hurricane Earl 

A tropical wave producing widespread disorganized showers and thunderstorms moved off the west coast of Africa on August 25. After moving across the eastern and central tropical Atlantic, the disturbance encountered environmental conditions east of the Leeward Islands that were only marginally conducive for tropical cyclone development. After struggling against high wind shear for several days, the disturbance was finally able to become better organized and developed into Tropical Storm Earl early on September 3. A burst of deep convection occurred near Earl's center during the evening of September 5, and a Hurricane Hunters mission into the storm later that night reported that it briefly strengthened to very near hurricane strength. Earl's intensity continued to fluctuate throughout much of the next day due to continued effects of westerly deep-layer shear. Later that day, the shear began to quickly diminish, and Earl became better organized, strengthening into a hurricane around 00:00 UTC on September 7. By 03:00 UTC on September 8, Earl reached Category 2 strength while moving northward; Hurricane Hunters data showed it to have an eye of almost  and a fairly symmetric wind field. After maintaining this intensity for several hours, Earl weakened to a Category 1 hurricane again at 15:00 UTC on September 10, then transitioned into an extratropical low south of Cape Race, Newfoundland six hours later.

Two people died on September 4 in Salinas, Puerto Rico, after being struck by lightning while riding a jet ski. There were localized power outages across the archipelago but no large-scale damage was observed. During a  period   of rain fell in the St. Johns area, causing overflowing along the Waterford River which led to urban flooding. Similar rainfall amounts were also reported in communities throughout the Avalon Peninsula. Additionally, the cyclone caused rough surf which damaged the breakwater on the coast in the area of Trepassey, Newfoundland and Labrador, causing localized flooding.

Hurricane Fiona 

Early on September 12, the NHC began to monitor a tropical wave over the central tropical Atlantic for gradual development, though environmental conditions for development were assessed as only marginally favorable. Even so, shower and thunderstorm activity within the disturbance began to become more concentrated later that same day, then increased and became better organized during the next day. The circulation associated with the system became more defined and persisted overnight and into the morning of September 14, attaining sufficient organization to designated as Tropical Depression Seven later that day. Despite the continued effects of moderate westerly shear and dry mid-level air flow, new satellite imagery indicated the depression had strengthened, thus at 01:45 UTC on September 15, it became Tropical Storm Fiona. The storm moved over Guadeloupe as a  tropical storm around 00:00 UTC on September 16 and then entered the eastern Caribbean. Fiona weakened slightly as it moved overland, but began to rapidly strengthen once back over water, becoming a Category 2 hurricane by 21:00 UTC on September 19, and then a Category 3 major hurricane early the next morning near Grand Turk Island.

Fiona's wind field also began to grow in size and tropical storm-strength winds impacted Bermuda for several hours on September 23, despite Fiona passing well west of the island. Shortly thereafter, Fiona weakened again before turning northward and quickly transitioning into a large and powerful post-tropical cyclone as it approached the coast of Nova Scotia at 03:00 UTC on September 24. It then moved over Cape Breton Island with hurricane strength winds, although it continued to weaken as it moved northward. Fiona would continue to weaken as it moved erratically northward into the northwestern Atlantic before dissipating west of Greenland over Baffin Bay on September 28.

Altogether, 31 deaths have been attributed to Fiona: 1 in Guadeloupe, 25 in Puerto Rico, 2 in the Dominican Republic and 3 in Canada. In addition, the effects of the storm resulted in an island-wide power grid failure. Damage to public infrastructure alone in Puerto Rico exceeds $5 billion. In Canada, homes and businesses across Atlantic Canada and Quebec's North Coast were destroyed, and several hundred thousand people were left without power in Fiona's wake. Insured damages in the region total more than $495 million (USD), making Fiona the costliest storm on record in Atlantic Canada.

Tropical Storm Gaston 

A tropical wave moved off the west coast of Africa and entered the Atlantic on September 12, initially producing disorganized showers and thunderstorms. After moving generally westward to about midway between Africa and the Lesser Antilles, deep convection began consolidating along the northern side of the wave between September 16 and September 17. Although a surface low developed on September 19, convection remained insufficiently organized. The depression strengthened into Tropical Storm Gaston six hours later while moving north-northeastward along the western periphery of a high-pressure area. Although water temperatures were only marginally favorable and moderate to strong wind shear impacted the storm, Gaston strengthened to peak with sustained winds of 65 mph (100 km/h) early on September 21.

However, additional strengthening was prevented as dry air intruded into Gaston. A blocking mid-level high pressure caused the storm to turn southeastward and then southwestward on September 23 and later to the westward on the following day. Passing between the Azores late on September 23 and early on September 24, Gaston generated heavy rainfall across the archipelago, especially in the western and central islands. The remnant low moved west-southwestward until dissipating about 48 hours later.

Hurricane Ian 

On September 19, the NHC began tracking a tropical wave to the east of the Windward Islands for possible gradual development. Two days later, the disturbance passed over Trinidad and Tobago as it entered the southeast Caribbean, and then near to the ABC Islands and the northern coast of South America. On September 22, while moving west-northwestward, it showed signs of increasing organization, though strong wind shear of  generated by the upper-level outflow from Hurricane Fiona was inhibiting the development of a tropical depression. Even so, a well-defined circulation was able to form within the disturbance that day; its convection then increased and became persistent over night into the next day, resulting in it being designated Tropical Depression Nine early on September 23. The organization of the depression improved slowly over the course of that day, and it became Tropical Storm Ian at 03:00 UTC on September 24. The high wind shear from Fiona was gone completely by the next day, as the storm entered the central Caribbean where it encountered wind, water and atmosphere conditions favorable for intensification: light wind shear, warm  sea surface temperatures and a mid-level relative humidity of 70%. In this environment, Ian quickly become better organized and strengthened into a Category 1 hurricane at 09:00 UTC on September 26. Twelve hours later, it intensified into a Category 2 hurricane as it approached the western tip of Cuba. After about six hours over land, Ian emerged off the north coast of Cuba into the Gulf of Mexico, still a major hurricanethough a slightly weaker one.

Once that cycle was complete, Ian rapidly strengthened, reaching Category 4 intensity on the morning of September 28, according to data from a Reserve Hurricane Hunter aircraft, with its maximum sustained winds rising to a high-end Category 4 speed of near  by 10:35 UTC. It then proceeded across Central Florida before moving offshore into the Atlantic Ocean at 15:00 UTC near Cape Canaveral as a strong tropical storm. At the time, the storm was exhibiting some extratropical characteristics, such as a comma pattern and some frontal features in its outer circulation. Even so, it remained a hybrid tropical cyclone as it maintained a warm core. Later that day, while making a turn to the north-northeast, Ian reintensified into a hurricane as it moved over the Gulf Stream. The system turned northward on the morning of September 30, and accelerated. During this time, deep convection re-developed near the center of the storm and the frontal features moved away from its core. An eyewall also began to form around a portion of its circulation. Ian began to weaken inland, and transitioned into a post-tropical cyclone over coastal South Carolina three hours after landfall. The cyclone later dissipated over southern Virginia late on October 1.

While in the early stages of developing, the system brought gusty winds and heavy rain to Trinidad and Tobago, the ABC Islands and to the northern coast of South America on  Ian killed five people in Cuba. It also caused extensive damage to homes, factories, roads and tobacco farms throughout the region. Power was initially knocked out throughout three provinces, but later the nation's entire electrical grid collapsed. Significant storm surge inundation occurred along the coasts of the Gulf of Guanahacabibes and Isla de la Juventud.

It is estimated that at least 114 people have died in Florida as a result of the hurricane, including 49 in Lee County where it made landfall. It also includes 7 Cuban migrants who drowned when their boat capsized off Stock Island as Ian moved through the Florida Keys; 11 others were still missing. 14 tornadoes touched down in Florida on September 27-28, as Ian approached, including one tornado that impacted Florida Atlantic University in Boca Raton before strengthening to high-end EF2 strength in Kings Point, causing significant damage and two injuries. Ian inflicted catastrophic damage in Southwest Florida, washing out roads and bridges, toppling trees, and destroying homes and businesses. Later, in South Carolina, Ian caused far less property damage, and there were no reports of casualties from the storm there. Five storm-related deaths were, however, reported in North Carolina; two tornadoes were also confirmed in the state. Ian's remnants also contributed to coastal flooding along the Mid-Atlantic coast.

Tropical Storm Hermine 

On September 22, a tropical wave being monitored by the NHC emerged off the coast of West Africa into the tropical Atlantic east of Cabo Verde. It quickly organized, becoming Tropical Depression Ten at 12:00 UTC on September 23, and then strengthened into Tropical Storm Hermine six hours later. It is one of few tropical cyclones on record to form and to track between the Cabo Verde Islands and the coast of Africa. Development beyond a weak, 40 mph (65 km/h)-tropical storm was stymied by southwesterly shear into the next day as the system moved northward. The remnant low moved northeastward until degenerating into a surface trough early on September 26 to the southwest of the Canary Islands.

Additionally, more than 140 flights were cancelled across the archipelago. Damage in the Canary Islands exceeded 10 million euro (US$9.8 million), while no fatalities were reported there.

Tropical Depression Eleven 

On September 17, a tropical wave emerged into the Atlantic from the west coast of Africa. After producing disorganized convective activity for the next few days as the wave headed westward, showers and thunderstorms consolidated enough on September 20 that a low-pressure area formed. The system then moved northward due to a break in a mid-level ridge and eastward by September 27 due to a nearby broad trough. The depression resumed a general northward motion due to the aforementioned ridge. Despite periodic bursts in deep convection, the depression remained poorly organized due to increasing wind shear.

Tropical Depression Twelve

On September 29, a tropical wave emerged into the Atlantic from the west coast of Africa. Showers and thunderstorms associated with the wave waned during the next few days as it tracked westward. However, a nearby Kelvin wave enhanced the wave's convective activity beginning on October 3. Moving generally northwestward due to a weakness in a mid-level ridge, the depression encountered strong wind shear, with the center of the cyclone becoming completely exposed from its convection by early the following day. Throughout the day on October 5, the depression's circulation became more elongated. The trough associated with the remnants of the depression became indistinguishable within a few days.

Hurricane Julia

A tropical wave emerged into the Atlantic from the west coast of Africa on September 26. While moving westward, the wave remained weak and consisted of little convection for the next few days. Convection became more concentrated as the wave reached the Caribbean, with the system organizing into a tropical depression early on October 7 near Curaçao. A strong burst of deep convection developed near the center of the depression as it moved across the Guajira Peninsula in the early morning of October 7, and soon afterward, it strengthened into Tropical Storm Julia over the adjacent southwestern Caribbean. Thereafter, Julia began moving in a more westward direction along the southern periphery of a building ridge. Low wind shear, high humidity at the mid-levels, and very warm seas caused the storm to intensify into a hurricane at 00:00 UTC on October 9. About six hours later, Julia peaked with maximum sustained winds of 85 mph (140 km/h). The storm then made landfall near Laguna de Perlas, Nicaragua, at 07:15 UTC. Julia's relatively quick movement, as well as its passage across areas comparatively less rugged than to the north, caused the cyclone to only gradually weaken, falling to tropical storm intensity late on October 9. Early the following day, Julia emerged into the Pacific Ocean but quickly dissipated after striking El Salvador several hours later.

On October 5, the disturbance brought heavy thunderstorms to several of the Windward Islands and the Caribbean coast of South America. A few days later, heavy rainfall occurred in northern areas of Venezuela and Colombia, causing widespread flooding. There were 54 indirect flood fatalities in Venezuela. In Central America, flash flooding and associated mudslides caused widespread damage along with 35 direct fatalities. Altogether, there were at least 89 Julia-related fatalities: 54 in Venezuela, 14 in Guatemala, 10 in El Salvador, 5 in Nicaragua, 4 in Honduras, and 2 in Panama. Nicaragua suffered extensive flood damage totaling about $400 million. Over 1 million people in the country lost electricity during the storm. Additionally, Costa Rica, Honduras, and Panama reported damage to thousands of homes and significant crop losses. Loses in Panama alone totaled least $6 million.

Tropical Storm Karl

A disturbance associated with the remnants of Julia formed over the Yucatán Peninsula on October 10 and reached the Bay of Campeche on October 11. However, increasing wind shear began to weaken the storm early on October 13 as it stalled over the southwestern Gulf of Mexico. Nonetheless, Karl's central pressure began to fall slightly after it began moving south-southeastward as the day progressed. Moderate northwesterly shear and drier mid-level air continued to inhibit Karl from strengthening on October 14. Although satellite images that morning showed that the dense overcast around the storm's low-level center had become more symmetric overnight, with its heavy thunderstorms concentrated to the southeast of the center, dry air and wind shear snuffed out all of Karl's deep convection several hours later. Around 00:00 UTC on October 15, Karl degenerated into a remnant low. The remnants of Karl moved towards Tabasco before dissipating about 24 hours later.

Karl caused significant flooding in southern Mexico, which damaged homes, businesses, and bridges throughout the region. The heaviest rainfall occurred in Tabasco and neighboring Chiapas; Camoapa, Tabasco, recorded  of rain in 24 hours on October  while Río de Janeiro, Chiapas, recorded  during that same period. Numerous families had to be evacuated from their homes because of the flooding, which also forced the evacuation of more than a thousand people attending a religious event in Pichucalco, Chiapas. Additionally, three storm-related fatalities were reported in Chiapas: one in Pichucalco and two in Juárez.

Hurricane Lisa

On October 28, a broad area of low pressure developed over the southeastern Caribbean causing rain and thunderstorms. As a result, and due to the threat the developing system posed to land areas in the central Caribbean, the NHC initiated advisories on it as Potential Tropical Cyclone Fifteen later that day. The disturbance became organized as Tropical Storm Lisa at 15:00 UTC on October 31, south of Jamaica. At the time, most of the storm's heavy thunderstorm activity was occurring to the east and south sides of the center as a result of westerly wind shear. Later that day the shear winds began to decrease, allowing Lisa to become better organized. The storm began to form more convection to the northwest of the center and data from a hurricane hunters mission indicated that the low-level circulation was becoming less elongated. The cyclone then moved over the Bay of Campeche early the following day, where its deep convection increased, though confined primarily to the north of its center by strong winds. On November 5, the cyclone was downgraded to into a remnant low.

There were no reports of fatalities connected with Lisa. Passing over Belize City as it made landfall on November 2, High winds knocked down trees and electric poles, and damaged several homes; some structures collapsed completely. Altogether, the 12 shelters set up in the city housed 1,221 people. In Guatemala, Lisa caused flooding and a landslide, which damaged homes and property. About 143 people in the municipalities of Melchor de Mencos and San José were evacuated to shelters. Lisa also brought heavy rains to southern Mexico.

Hurricane Martin

On October 31, the NHC began monitoring a non-tropical area of low pressure located in the central subtropical Atlantic that, although attached to a frontal boundary, had a small core with gale-force winds and a concentrated area of convection near its center. Early on November 1, deep convection developed near the center, which had become separated from the frontal boundary. At the same time the system developed a non-frontal warm core, resulting in the formation of Tropical Storm Martin. The storm continued to organize into the next day, as a better-defined eye developed, with a tight banding pattern wrapping around the center, which resulted in Martin strengthening into a Category 1 hurricane. While maintaining hurricane strength, Martin transitioned into a post-tropical cyclone on November 3, over the open North Atlantic. A few days later, the cyclone approached Ireland as a large and intense European windstorm.

Hurricane Nicole

On November 4, the NHC began monitoring the northeastern Caribbean Sea and southwestern Atlantic where a large non-tropical low pressure system was expected to develop within a few days. On November 5, an area of low pressure producing disorganized showers and thunderstorms developed just north of Puerto Rico. Benefiting from the inflow of tropical moisture from the Caribbean and very warm  sea surface temperatures, the disturbance was soon exhibiting some subtropical characteristics, and gradually becoming better organized. This trend continued, and it was classified as Subtropical Storm Nicole at 09:00 UTC on November 7. The following morning, inner-core convection within the system improved and the radius of its maximum winds contracted, indicating that Nicole had transitioned into a tropical cyclone. At 08:00 UTC on November 10, Nicole made land fall on North Hutchinson Island, near Vero Beach, Florida, with  sustained winds. Nicole then weakened to a tropical storm inland, as it moved across Central Florida. Later that day, its center briefly emerged over the Gulf of Mexico, north of Tampa, before moving onshore again northwest of Cedar Key in Florida's Big Bend region. Inland, the storm weakened to a depression, as it moved into southwestern Georgia. Later, on the afternoon of November 11, Nicole become post-tropical while over West Virginia.

Despite being relatively weak, Nicole's large size produced widespread heavy rainfall and strong winds across the Greater Antilles, The Bahamas, and Florida, knocking out power and inflicting significant damage in many areas. Days of strong on-shore wind flow onto the east coast of Florida produced severe beach erosion, especially in Volusia, St. Johns, and Flagler counties. Eleven deaths altogether were indirectly connected to the storm, six in the Dominican Republic and five in Florida.

Other system 

On August 15, the NHC first noted the potential for tropical cyclone development in the southwestern Gulf of Mexico from a tropical wave that was located over the central Caribbean Sea. The low emerged over the Gulf early on August 19 producing disorganized showers. Due to the threat the developing system posed to northeastern Mexico and South Texas, the NHC initiated advisories on it as Potential Tropical Cyclone Four at 21:00 UTC that same day. As the disturbance moved northwestward toward the Gulf coast of Mexico on August 20, a Hurricane Hunters mission found that it was still a surface trough. With that, the window of opportunity for tropical development closed, and the NHC issued its last advisory on the system at 03:00 UTC on August 21. The disturbance brought heavy rain to coastal Tamaulipas and coastal South Texas, but no significant impacts associated with the disturbance were reported.

Storm names 

The following list of names was used for named storms that formed in the North Atlantic in 2022. Retired names, if any, will be announced by the World Meteorological Organization in the 45th RA IV Hurricane Committee, which is scheduled for the week of March 27–31, 2023. The names not retired from this list will be used again in the 2028 season. This is the same list used in the 2016 season, with the exceptions of Martin and Owen, which replaced Matthew and Otto, respectively. The name Martin was used for the first time this season.

Season effects 

This is a table of all of the storms that formed in the 2022 Atlantic hurricane season. It includes their duration (within the basin), names, areas affected, damages, and death totals. Deaths in parentheses are additional and indirect (an example of an indirect death would be a traffic accident), but were still related to that storm. Damage and deaths include totals while the storm was extratropical, a wave, or a low, and all of the damage figures are in 2022 USD.

See also 

 Weather of 2022
 Tropical cyclones in 2022
 Atlantic hurricane season
 2022 Pacific hurricane season
 2022 Pacific typhoon season
 2022 North Indian Ocean cyclone season
 South-West Indian Ocean cyclone seasons: 2021–22, 2022–23
 Australian region cyclone seasons: 2021–22, 2022–23
 South Pacific cyclone seasons: 2021–22, 2022–23

Notes

References

External links 

 National Hurricane Center Website
 National Hurricane Center's Atlantic Tropical Weather Outlook
 Tropical Cyclone Formation Probability Guidance Product

 
Atlantic hurricane seasons
Tropical cyclones in 2022